Ridgecrest Regional Hospital is a hospital located in Ridgecrest, California which is just east of the Southern Sierra Mountains in the Indian Wells Valley. It has two specialty units, including pediatric and intensive care. The hospital was established in the mid-1940s out of a need for medical care for the workforce of the growing China Lake Naval Weapons Station.It is the only regional healthcare system in the area and provides a variety of services to the region. Jim Suver serves as the CEO of the hospital.

Services
Ridgecrest Regional Hospital provides family medicine services through the Southern Sierra Medical Clinic and Rural Health Clinic.  The hospital offers the following services:

 Cardiology/Cardiac Rehab
 Cardiopulmonary/Respiratory Care
 Case Management/Social Services
 Critical Care Unit
 Education
 Emergency Services
 Home Health
 Maternal/Child/Family Unit
 Pastoral Care
 Patient Care Conferences
 Radiology
 Rehabilitation Services
 Surgery and Outpatient Services
 Telemedicine

History

The hospital was established by Dr. Thomas Drummond in 1945 as Ridgecrest Community Hospital. The hospital has seen several expansions over the years: a new wing was added in 1968; an intensive-care unit in 1976; and a four-phased major expansion was begun in 1987.

References

External links
 Official Ridgecrest Regional Hospital website
 City of Ridgecrest:  Health and Safety

Hospitals in Kern County, California
Ridgecrest, California